Katelyn Pope (born 29 March 1996) is an Australian cricketer and Australian rules footballer. She played cricket as a left arm swing bowler for South Australian Scorpions and Adelaide Strikers and plays football for the West Coast Eagles.

Pope made her debut for the Scorpions in round three of the 2014–15 season against the ACT Meteors.  She played a total of 11 matches that season.  The following season, 2015–16, she was a member of the title winning Scorpions team in the WNCL Grand Final.  In December 2015, she was recruited by Wellington to compete in the New Zealand Women's Under 21 Tournament.

Pope was added to the Strikers' squad for its WBBL02 campaign (2016–17).  She has been described by the Strikers as being renowned for her consistent line and length bowling.

In November 2018, she was named in the Adelaide Strikers' squad for the 2018–19 Women's Big Bash League season.

Despite sharing a surname and also having red hair, she is not related to fellow South Australian cricketer Lloyd Pope.

Pope switched to play Australian rules football for North Adelaide Football Club in the SANFL Women's League. In 2021, she was selected by the West Coast Eagles as an injury replacement player for Mhicca Carter. She made her debut in the AFL Women's league in the second round of the 2021 AFL Women's season in the Western Derby. In June 2021, West Coast delisted her along with seven other players.

References

External links

Living people
1996 births
Australian women cricketers
Cricketers from South Australia
Sportswomen from South Australia
Adelaide Strikers (WBBL) cricketers
South Australian Scorpions cricketers
West Coast Eagles (AFLW) players